Ehmedê Xanî (1650, Hakkari – 1707, Bayazid), was a Kurdish intellectual, scholar, mystic and poet who is considered the founder of Kurdish nationalism. He was born in the Hakkâri region in 1650 and died in Bayazid in 1707.

The most important work of Xanî is Mem and Zin which is considered the national epic of Kurds. Other important works include Nûbiharan Biçûkan and Eqîdeya Îmanê. These works were studied in Kurdish schools from the time of Kani towards the 1930s.

Xanî admired Melayê Cizîrî and Feqiyê Teyran. Joyce Blau called him the spiritual son of Cizîrî, Teyran and Ali Hariri.

Biography 
Xanî was born in the village of Khan near Hakkari in 1650.

Nationalism 
Xanî is considered the founder of Kurdish nationalism and supported an independent Kurdistan. In a mathnawi from 1694, he chose not to devote parts of the introduction to praise the rulers of his time, which was typical in classical Oriental literature. Instead, the preface of the mathnawi was dedicated to his opinions on Kurdish nationalism. He explained the subjugation of Kurds by the Ottomans and the Safavids, their occupation of Kurdistan which he argued had become a reality because of the lack of a Kurdish monarch who could rule Kurdistan. Such a ruler could liberate Kurds from the 'vile'. He also believed that an independent Kurdistan could safeguard the Kurdish language for scientific and intellectual purposes.

In the epic Mem and Zin, he writes:

Works 

Mem û Zîn (Mem and Zin)
 Eqîdeya Îmanê (The Path of Faith)
 Eqîdeya Îslamê (Basics of Islam)
 Nûbihara Biçûkan (The Spring of Children)
 Erdê Xweda (Astronomy and Geography book)
 Dîwana Helbestan

References

External links

 
 Ahmad Khani, Kurdish Academy of Language KAL
 Our Trouble by Ehmedê Xanî, Noahs Ark Holidays

Khani, Ahmad
Kurdish-language poets
Kurdish-language writers
Kurdish scholars
Kurdish philosophers
Kurdish scientists
Kurdish historians
Kurdish people from the Ottoman Empire
1650 births
1707 deaths
Lexicographers
People from Hakkâri Province
17th-century Kurdish people
18th-century Kurdish people

Kurdish nationalists